The question of whether the historical Jesus was in good mental health has been explored by multiple psychologists, philosophers, historians, and writers. The first person to openly question Jesus' sanity was French psychologist Charles Binet-Sanglé, the chief physician of Paris and author of the book La Folie de Jésus. This view finds both supporters and opponents.

Opinions challenging the sanity of Jesus
The assessment of the sanity of Jesus first occurs in the gospels. The Gospel of Mark reports the opinion of members of his family who believe that Jesus "is beside himself." Some psychiatrists, religious scholars and writers explain that Jesus' family, followers (John 7:20), and contemporaries seriously regarded him as delusional, possessed by demons, or insane.<ref>{{cite book |last=Kasmar |first=Gene |title=All the obscenities in the Bible |publisher=Kas-mark Pub. Co. |location=Brooklyn Center, MN |date=1995 |page=157 |isbn=978-0-9645-9950-5 |quote=He was thought to be insane by his own family and neighbors in 'when his friends heard of it, they went out to lay hold on him: for they said, He is beside himself... (Mark 3:21–22 – The Greek existemi, translated as "beside himself", actually means insane and witless). The Greek 'ho para, translated as "friends", also means family.}}</ref>

The accusation contained in the Gospel of John is more literal:

, a lecturer at the University of Cambridge, suggests in his article ″The Madness of King Jesus: Why was Jesus Put to Death, but his Followers were not?″ (2007) and in his book The Madness of King Jesus: The Real Reasons for His Execution (2010) that Pilate and the other Roman people regarded Jesus as an insane deceived lunatic. According to the Gospels, Jesus was presented to Pilate and sentenced to death as a royal pretender, but the standard Roman procedure was the prosecution and execution of would-be insurgents with their leaders. Therefore, to suggest that Jesus was put to death by the Roman authorities as some kind of royal pretender does not explain sufficiently why he was killed, unlike his disciples.

Jean Meslier (1664–1729) had similar thoughts in the 18th century. In chapters 33 and 34 of his Testament, he provides evidence for his conclusion that Jesus ″was really a madman, a fanatic″.

Challenging the sanity of Jesus continued in the 19th century with the first quest for the historical Jesus. David Friedrich Strauss (second edition, 1864) claimed that Jesus was a fanatic. Lemuel K. Washburn (Was Jesus insane?) concluded, "Jesus was not divine, but insane". Oskar Panizza introduced Jesus as a psychopathological and paranoid case. Oskar Holtzmann (1903) diagnosed Jesus to be "ecstatic", which he described to be a pathologically-strong excitability of the imagination and the power of will.  (as George de Loosten, 1905) attempted to retrospectively diagnose Jesus as generally mentally ill, similarly to Jean Meslier.  (1905) determined Jesus to be either epileptic or paranoid. Using a few examples, he developed a description of the typical pathological prophet ("Prophetentypus") and applied it to Jesus.  (1908) hypothesised that the abnormalities he found in Jesus' behaviour could be explained by a nerve overstimulation. However, it was not until the publication of Charles Binet-Sanglé's four-volume work  from 1908 to 1915 that the topic was extensively and visibly discussed.

Binet-Sanglé diagnosed Jesus as suffering from religious paranoia:

His view was shared by the New York psychiatrist William Hirsch, who in 1912 published his study, Religion and Civilization: The Conclusions of a Psychiatrist, which enumerated a number of Jesus' mentally-aberrant behaviours. Hirsch agreed with Binet-Sanglé in that Jesus had been afflicted with hallucinations and pointed to his "megalomania, which mounted ceaselessly and immeasurably". Hirsch concluded that Jesus was just a "paranoid":

The Soviet psychiatrist Y. V. Mints (1927) also diagnosed Jesus as suffering from paranoia. The literature of the Soviet Union in the 1920s, following the tradition of the demythologization of Jesus in the works of Strauss, Renan, Nietzsche, and Binet-Sanglé, put forward two main themes: mental illness and deception. That was reflected in Mikhail Bulgakov's novel The Master and Margarita in which Jesus is depicted by Pontius Pilate as a harmless madman. It was only at the turn of the 1920s and the 1930s that the mythological option, the denial of the existence of Jesus, won the upper hand in Soviet propaganda.

Jesus' mental health was also questioned by the British psychiatrists William Sargant and Raj Persaud, a number of psychologists of the psychoanalytic orientation, like  in his study .

He also had difficulties communicating with the outside world and dissociative identity disorder, which made him a schizothymic or even schizophrenic type (according to Ernst Kretschmer's typology).

The English psychiatrist Anthony Storr in his final book Feet of Clay; Saints, Sinners, and Madmen: A Study of Gurus (1996) suggested that there are psychological similarities between crazy "messiahs" such as Jim Jones and David Koresh and respected religious leaders including Jesus. Storr tracks typical patterns, often involving psychotic disorders that shape the development of the guru. His study is an attempt to look at Jesus as one of many gurus. Storr agrees with most scholars of historical Jesus, who are inclined to the hypothesis of Jesus as apocalyptic prophet:

Storr recognises Jesus' many similarities to other gurus. It was, for example, going through a period of internal conflict during his fasting in the desert. According to Storr, if Jesus really considered himself a deputy for God and believed that one day he would come down from heaven to rule, he was very similar to the gurus whom he had previously described as preachers of delusions possessed by mania of greatness. He notes that Jesus was not ideal in family life (Mark 3:31–35, Mark 13:12–13). Gurus often remain indifferent to family ties. Other similarities, according to Storr, include Jesus' faith in receiving a special revelation from God and a tendency to elitism, in the sense that Jesus believed that he had been specially marked by God.

In 1998–2000, Leszek Nowak (born 1962) from Poznań, Poland authored a study in which, based on his own history of religious delusion of mission and overvalued ideas and information communicated in the Gospels, made an attempt at reconstructing Jesus' psyche, with the view of Jesus as apocalyptic prophet, taking into account the hypothesis of "suicide by proxy". He does so in chapters containing, in sequence, an analysis of character traits of the "savior of mankind", a description of the possible course of events from the period of Jesus' public activity, and a naturalistic explanation of his miracles.

In 2012, a team of psychiatrists, behavioral psychologists, neurologists and neuropsychiatrists from the Harvard Medical School published a research that suggested the development of a new diagnostic category of psychiatric disorders related to religious delusion and hyperreligiosity. They compared the thoughts and behaviors of the most important figures in the Bible (Abraham, Moses, Jesus, and Paul) with patients affected by mental disorders related to the psychotic spectrum using different clusters of disorders and diagnostic criteria (DSM-IV-TR), and concluded that these Biblical figures "may have had psychotic symptoms that contributed inspiration for their revelations", such as schizophrenia, schizoaffective disorder, bipolar disorder, delusional disorder, delusions of grandeur, auditory-visual hallucinations, paranoia, Geschwind syndrome (especially Paul) and abnormal experiences associated with temporal lobe epilepsy (TLE). The authors hypothesised that Jesus may have sought death through "suicide by proxy".

Opinions defending the sanity of Jesus
Opinions and publications questioning the sanity of Jesus, especially Charles Binet-Sanglé and William Hirsch, triggered polemical reactions. They were first challenged by Albert Schweitzer in his doctoral thesis, The Psychiatric Study of Jesus: Exposition and Criticism, (1913) and by the American theologian  in his 1922 book, The psychic health of Jesus. Bundy summarized his defense of Jesus′ sanity:

In 1908, Philipp Kneib, in his book, defended the sanity of Jesus against the arguments of Holtzmann, Lomer, Rasmussen and Baumann.

The mental health of Jesus is also defended by psychiatrists Olivier Quentin Hyder, also by Pablo Martinez and Andrew Sims in their book Mad or God? Jesus: The healthiest mind of all (2018). Christian apologists, such as Josh McDowell and Lee Strobel, also take up the subject of Jesus' sanity defense.

The defense of Jesus' mental health was devoted to an editorial in the magazine of Italian Jesuits , published November 5, 1994. To the title question  ("What if Jesus was deceived?") the editors replied in the negative by arguing that Jesus was not a fanatic or megalomaniac but a mentally-healthy and very realistic person. Therefore, he did not deceive himself by saying that he was the messiah and the Son of God.

Pope Benedict XVI wrote in his book Jesus of Nazareth'':

C. S. Lewis famously considered Jesus' mental health in what is known as Lewis's trilemma (the formulation quoted here is by John Duncan):

The agnostic atheist New Testament scholar Bart Ehrman wrote on his own blog:

See also

Notes

References

Further reading

External links
 
 
 
 

Jesus
Mental health
Jesus
Jesus